Sean Patrick Lonsdale (born 7 June 1997) is a rugby union lock for Dragons RFC in the United Rugby Championship.

Career
Born in Manchester, Lonsdale was educated at Rydal Penrhos School in north Wales and played for RGC 1404 in the Welsh Championship, the second division of domestic rugby.

Lonsdale left RGC to join Exeter Chiefs in 2016, he spent time on loan at Taunton and Plymouth Albion.  He made his debut for Exeter's first team on 3 February 2018 against Saracens at Sandy Park.  On 5 January 2019 Lonsdale's last minute try against Bristol Bears saw Exeter return to the top of the Premiership Rugby table.

He joined Dragons RFC in 2022, and is eligible to represent Wales through his Welsh-born mother.

References

1997 births
Living people
English rugby union players
Exeter Chiefs players
RGC 1404 players
Rugby union locks
Rugby union players from Manchester
Dragons RFC players